During the 1989–90 season, Newcastle United participated in the Football League Division Two. After the disappointment of the previous season's relegation, the manager Jim Smith again dabbled in the transfer market, offloading the captain Kenny Sansom, the former captain Glenn Roeder, Denmark's Frank Pingel, Rob McDonald and the promising youngsters Michael O'Neill and Darren Jackson.

With new signings including their former player Mark McGhee, the team started the season with an emphatic 5–2 win over Leeds United at St. James' Park that saw another new signing, Micky Quinn, score four times on his debut. After a promising start, the team struggled until Smith signed the Scotland skipper, Roy Aitken, who instilled steel into a lightweight midfield of ball players Kevin Brock, Kevin Dillon and John Gallacher. United regained their momentum with a change of formation that saw Bjorn Kristensen switched to sweeper and the team returned to the top of the table, only to be overtaken by Leeds and Sheffield United. Left to compete in the promotion play-offs after finishing third, they lost to their local rivals Sunderland in the semi-finals. It was a disappointing end to a season that also saw unrest from the fans and talk of take-overs.

Appearances, goals and cards
(Substitute appearances in brackets)

Coaching staff

External links
Newcastle United Football Club - Fixtures 1989-90
Season Details - 1989-90 - toon1892

Newcastle United F.C. seasons
Newcastle United